Augustin Deac (9 August 1928 – 29 January 2004) was a Romanian author and history professor.

Biography
Augustin Deac was born in Giurtelecu Şimleului, Transylvania, into a Greek Catholic family. His early school years were at Şimleul Silvaniei and Zalău. He graduated from the Faculty of History and Archaeology, University of Cluj, as assistant to the academician Constantin Daicoviciu. He was awarded his doctorate at the University of Bucharest, where he was a lead researcher in the Institute of History and Political Studies.

Deac taught at several colleges and universities and published over 40 scientific papers and books. Augustin Deac brought a microfilm of the Rohonc Codex from  Budapest, Hungary, to Romania, where it was studied by Viorica Enăchiuc.

Major works
 Marea Unire 
 Revizionismul ungar - factor destabilizator in Europa 
 The History of the Historical Truth. Bucharest: Editura Tentant, 2001 Istoria Adevarului Istoric  
 Mosii si Stramosii Poporului Roman. 
 Din istoria Ucrainei - "Tara de margine" 
 Pagini din istoria adevarata a Bulgariei 
 .
 .
 .

References

External links
 https://web.archive.org/web/20090316081559/http://www.dacia.org/mag-2004-10.pdf

1928 births
2004 deaths
Romanian political scientists
People from Sălaj County
Romanian essayists
Romanian schoolteachers
University of Bucharest alumni
Babeș-Bolyai University alumni
Academic staff of the University of Bucharest
Romanian biographers
Male biographers
Romanian textbook writers
20th-century Romanian historians
Romanian Greek-Catholics
Romanian journalists
Romanian memoirists
Romanian science writers
Romanian civil servants
Romanian educators
Male essayists
20th-century essayists
20th-century Romanian male writers
20th-century journalists
20th-century memoirists
20th-century political scientists